Mary Pope may refer to:

Mary Pope Osborne (born 1949), American children's book author
USS Mary Pope (SP-291), a United States Navy patrol vessel in commission from 1917 to 1919
 Namesake of the Mary Soper Pope Memorial Award